Preluci may refer to several places in Romania:

 Preluci, a village in Agăș Commune, Bacău County
 Preluci, a village in Lozna Commune, Sălaj County